This list of the prehistoric life of Wisconsin contains the various prehistoric life-forms whose fossilized remains have been reported from within the US state of Wisconsin.

Precambrian
The Paleobiology Database records no known occurrences of Precambrian fossils in Wisconsin.

Paleozoic

Selected Paleozoic taxa of Wisconsin

 †Acernaspis
 †Acidaspis
 †Actinoceras
  †Aglaspis
 †Agraulos
 †Amplexopora
 †Amplexus
 †Arctinurus
 †Athyris
 †Atrypa
 †Atrypa reticularis – tentative report
  †Bumastus
 †Bumastus armatus
 †Bumastus cuniculus
 †Bumastus dayi
 †Bumastus ioxus
 †Bumastus niagarensis
 †Bumastus tenuis
 †Calymene
  †Calymene celebra
 †Catenipora
 †Cedaria
 †Ceratocephala
 †Ceraurus
 †Cheirurus
 †Chippewaella – type locality for genus
 †Chondrites
 †Chonetes
 †Conchidium
 †Conocoryphe
 †Coolina
 †Coolinia
 †Coosia
 †Corbina
  †Cornulites
 †Crepicephalus
 †Crotalocrinites
 †Cyathocrinites – tentative report
 †Cycloceras
 †Cypricardinia
 †Dalmanites
  †Deiphon
 †Dendrograptus
 †Dicoelosia
 †Dikelocephalus
 †Dimerocrinites
 †Dimerocrinites occidentalis
 †Distomodus
 †Distyrax
 †Dresbachia
 †Echinochiton – type locality for genus
 †Echinochiton dufoei – type locality for species
 †Ellesmeroceras
 †Ellipsocephalus
 †Elrodoceras
 †Encrinurus
 †Entomaspis
 †Eophacops
 †Eophacops handwerki
 †Eospirifer
 †Eospirifer radiatus
 †Eucalyptocrinites
 †Eucalyptocrinites crassus
  †Favosites
 †Geisonocerina
 †Hadromeros
  †Halysites
 †Harpidium
 †Hexameroceras
 †Holopea
 †Howella
 †Hyolithes
 †Hypseloconus
 †Illaenus
 †Inversoceras
 †Irvingella
  †Isotelus
 †Kionoceras
 †Krausella
 †Leonaspis
 †Leurocycloceras
 †Lingula
  †Lingulella
 †Lonchocephalus
 †Mackenziurus
 †Marsupiocrinus
 †Maryvillia
 †Matthevia
 †Meristina
 †Michelinoceras
 †Milaculum
 †Monograptus
 †Murchisonia
 †Norwoodia
 †Obolus
 †Ophioceras
 †Ozarkodina
 †Pelagiella
 †Pemphigaspis
 †Pentamerus
 †Pentlandia
  †Periechocrinus
 †Phragmolites
 †Plaesiomys
 †Plagiostomoceras
 †Planolites
 †Platyceras
 †Platystrophia
 †Plectodonta
  †Pleurodictyum
 Pleurotomaria
 †Polygrammoceras
 †Proetus
 †Sactorthoceras
  †Saukiella
 †Scutellum
 †Similodonta
 †Skenidioides
 †Skolithos
 †Sowerbyella
 †Sphaerexochus
 †Strophomena
 †Strophomena costata
 †Strophomena plattinensis
 †Subulites
 †Thalassinoides
  †Thylacares – type locality for genus
 †Thylacares brandonensis – type locality for species
 †Uranoceras
 †Westonia
 †Whitfieldia
 †Wurmiella
 †Wurmiella excavata

Mesozoic
The Paleobiology Database records no known occurrences of Mesozoic fossils in Wisconsin.

Cenozoic

 Acidota
 †Acidota quadrata
 Aegialia
 †Aegialia lacustris
 †Aegialia terminalis
  Agathidium
 Arpedium
 Asaphidion
 †Asaphidion yukonense
 Bembidion
 †Bembidion grapii
 †Bembidion mutatum
 Bledius
 Byrrhus
 Calathus
 †Calathus ingratus
 Carabus
 †Carabus taedatus
 Cercyon
 †Cercyon herceus
  Chironomus – or unidentified comparable form
 Conophthorus
 †Conophthorus coniperda – or unidentified comparable form
 Copromyza
 Cryptophagus
 Curimopsis
 Cytilus
 Dyschirius
 Eusphalerum – or unidentified comparable form
 Formica
 Helina – or unidentified comparable form
 †Mammuthus
  †Mammuthus primigenius
 Mecopeltus – or unidentified comparable form
 Myrmica
 Negastrius
  Notiophilus
 †Notiophilus directus
 Ochthebius
 Olophrum
 Pediacus
 †Pediacus fuscus
 Phloeosinus
 †Phloeosinus pini
 Phloeotribus
 †Phloeotribus piceae
 Pityophthorus
 †Pityophthorus puberulus
 Polygraphus
 †Polygraphus rufipennis
 Pterostichus – or unidentified comparable form
 Quedius
 †Quedius uteanus
 Scolytus
 †Scolytus piceae
 Simplocaria
 †Simplocaria tessellata
  Sitona
 Stenus
  Trechus
 †Trechus apicalis

References

 

Wisconsin-related lists
Wisconsin